M is a 2018 Finnish experimental film directed by Anna Eriksson. It was screened in the Venice International Film Critics' Week section at the Venice Film Festival. The film is loosely inspired by the last days of Marilyn Monroe.

Cast
Anna Eriksson (M)
Petri Salo (The psychiatrist)
Gail Ferguson (Georgia)
Axel Sutinen (Gardener)
Ari Vieno (The man in the car)
José Paiva Wolff (Ruby, The make up artist)
Quim-Ze Grilo (Anubis)
Gloria Bleezard-Levister (Melody Manners)
Alonso Levister (The TV-show host)
Susana Gonçalo (The girl in the veil)
Steve Remigio Delgado (Abraham)
Issey O’Brien (Psychiatrist daughter)
Veera Siivonen (The girl in the car)
Joni Segerros (The boy in the car)

Awards
The film received the Grand Prix and Best Feature Film awards at the 2019 Prague Independent Film Festival.

At the 2019 Vienna Independent Film Festival the film received Best Feature Film and Best Cinematography awards.

Best director Tarkovsky Award 2019 The Blow-up Arthouse Film Festival, Chicago

The Book on M
https://parvs.fi/en/books/m/?lang_switched=1

Art Exhibition Anna Eriksson M The Rituals of a Lonely B...h 5.9.2020 Rauma Art Museum
https://www.raumantaidemuseo.fi/en/exhibitions/upcoming-exhibitions/

References

External links
 

2018 films
2018 drama films
Finnish drama films
2010s Finnish-language films
Finnish avant-garde and experimental films
2010s avant-garde and experimental films
2010s English-language films
English-language Finnish films
Films about Marilyn Monroe